Yapp Hung Fai (born 21 March 1990) is a Hong Kong professional footballer who currently plays as a goalkeeper for Hong Kong Premier League club Eastern. He currently keeps the record for being the most capped player of the Hong Kong national football team, with 81 caps in total.

Club career
Born in a Hakka family, Yapp finished his studies at Form 5 level. He was accepted by Queen's College Old Boys Association Secondary School for Form 6 but he gave it up to pursue his football dream. He had already represented Hong Kong at under-17 level.

Workable
Yapp Hung Fai started his professional career at Workable when he was only 17 under coach Lee Kin Wo and Chan Hiu Ming in 2007. His salary was only HK$5,000. During his time at Workable FC, he helped the team to an unexpected 1:0 win against South China AA in the 2007-08 Hong Kong League Cup.

Pegasus
Yapp Hung Fai moved to Pegasus in 2009. After helping the club beat Citizen AA 2:1 to win the 2009-10 Hong Kong FA Cup and qualify for the 2011 AFC Cup, Yapp Hung Fai announced that he will join league champions South China AA along with teammate Lau Nim Yat. Yapp said he decided to join South China before the game and South China's Hong Kong location will be easier for him to attend school. He is also not worried about competing with Zhang Chunhui for the starting goalkeeper place.

South China
In 2010, Yapp Hung Fai moved to Hong Kong First Division League champions South China AA. On 29 September 2010, during Tottenham Hotspur's chief scout Ian Broomfield's visit to South China, he praised Yapp for his enormous potential. "This goalkeeper is not tall, but his reactions are sharp and he is quick to come out of the box to block strikers. He is also very committed and very well disciplined."

After defeating East Bengal in the 2011 AFC Cup game at home on 14 April 2011, South China striker Mateja Kezman suggested that Yapp Hung Fai has what it takes to play in European football leagues.

During the summer of 2013, Yapp had agreed to a 4.5 year contract with Guizhou Renhe. However, his registration was denied by the Chinese Football Association on the grounds that Yapp did not qualify as a domestic player and as such, would violate the Chinese Super League stipulations which require all keepers to be domestic players.

Eastern
In June 2014, Yapp returned to Eastern after his contract with South China expired.
In 2016, 
Yapp helped Eastern win the first Hong Kong Premier League Trophy.
On 28 September 2020 Yapp also helped Eastern win the 19-20 FA Cup. It is the fifth
FA cup trophy for Eastern.

International career

Hong Kong
On 11 February 2010, at the age of 19, Yapp made his senior debut in a 2010 East Asian Football Championship match against Japan.

In 2011, Yapp took part in the 2014 FIFA World Cup Asian qualification matches for Hong Kong against Saudi Arabia. Hong Kong lost the tie 0:8.

In the 2012 Guangdong-Hong Kong Cup, the first match at Hong Kong Stadium ended 2–2. After the second match ended as 0–0 in Huizhou Stadium, Yapp Hung-Fai saved 3 penalties in the penalty shoot-out to help Hong Kong win by 5–4. He is once again hailed as Hong Kong's cup winning hero.

On 10 September 2019, Hong Kong faced Iran in a match of 2022 FIFA World Cup Asian qualification. Yapp got his 71st cap for the national team with FIFA "A" international match, making him be the most capped player of the team.

Honours

Club
South China
Hong Kong First Division: 2012–13
Hong Kong FA Cup: 2010–11
Hong Kong League Cup: 2010–11

Pegasus
Hong Kong FA Cup: 2009–10

Eastern
Hong Kong Premier League: 2015–16
Hong Kong FA Cup: 2019–20
Hong Kong Sapling Cup: 2020–21

International
Hong Kong U-23
East Asian Games (1): 2009: Gold

Individual
Hong Kong Best Youth Player (2): 2010, 2013
Hong Kong Premier League Team of the Year (9) : 2010–17, 2021
Hong Kong Footballer of the Year: 2016

Career statistics

Club 
As of 26 December 2021

Notes

International

Hong Kong

Player profile
Yapp has excellent speed and reflexes, making him an ideal one-on-one goalkeeper. He has a great ability of rushing out and closing down the attacker, and can react quickly to shots. He is also an excellent penalty kick saver, having saved penalties on multiple big occasions. However, Yapp is susceptible to crosses and corner kicks due to his lack of height.

References

External links
 
 Yapp Hung Fai at HKFA
 

1990 births
Living people
Hong Kong people of Hakka descent
Hakka sportspeople
Association football goalkeepers
Eastern Sports Club footballers
TSW Pegasus FC players
South China AA players
Hong Kong First Division League players
Hong Kong Premier League players
Hong Kong footballers
Hong Kong international footballers
Footballers at the 2010 Asian Games
Footballers at the 2014 Asian Games
Asian Games competitors for Hong Kong